Where's My Roy Cohn? is a 2019 documentary film, directed by Matt Tyrnauer, and produced by Matt Tyrnauer, Marie Brenner, Corey Reeser, Joyce Deep, and Andrea Lewis. The film stars American lawyer Roy Cohn as himself, alongside Ken Auletta, Anne Roiphe, Roger Stone, Donald Trump, and Barbara Walters.  The title is reported to be a quote from President Donald Trump, as he discussed Attorney General Jeff Sessions's recusal from the Mueller Investigation.

Plot 
The film looks into New York attorney Roy Cohn whose career ranged from Senator Joseph McCarthy to real estate developer Donald Trump.

In 1951, Cohn is a 24-year-old legal assistant at the office of United States Attorney General J. Howard McGrath at the Justice Department. The "Communist menace" according to one of the commentators was preoccupying the public in the 1950s. Cohn serves on the prosecution team in the trial of Julius and Ethel Rosenberg. The commentators accuse judge Irving Kaufman of judicial misconduct.

Cohn graduates from Columbia Law School at the age of 20; he is admitted to the New York State Bar Association in 1948—at the age of 21.

In the 1940s and 1950s, being gay was widely seen a negative trait; people in positions of power in government weren't permitted to be LGBT. Cohn served as legal counsel during the Lavender scare in the 1950s. The commentators claim that there was "romantic crush" between David Schine and Cohn. Since being gay was a pejorative in the 1950s, the opposing counsel Joseph N. Welch in the Army–McCarthy hearings made many homophobic remarks against Cohn.

After 1955
Cohen develops close ties with Cardinal Spellman in New York. Cohn's great uncle was a founder of Lionel, LLC train company.

Cohn was engaged to Barbara Walters for a while.

1970s

Carmine Galante and Anthony Salerno hire Cohn as their attorney.

1980s
Donald Trump hires Cohn as his attorney. They first meet at the Le Club in Manhattan when Trump is 23 years old.

In interviews with Mike Wallace and Larry King, Cohn repeatedly and expressely states that he isn't gay; furthermore, he states that he doesn't have AIDS. The commentators say that Cohn had developed HIV-associated neurocognitive disorder shortly before dying.

Cast 

Roy Cohn
 Ken Auletta
 Anne Roiphe
 Roger Stone
 Donald Trump
 Barbara Walters

Reception

Critical response 
The website's consensus reads, "It's blunt rather than balanced, but Where's My Roy Cohn? does what it sets out to do, offering a disquieting summary of its subject's life and legacy." Metacritic, which uses a weighted average, assigned the film a score of 70 out of 100, based on 26 critics, indicating "Generally favorable reviews."

Leah Greenblatt of Entertainment Weekly wrote, "Tyrnauer smartly doesn’t overplay the symbolism of their relationship, or work too hard to connect the dots; it’s all there to take or leave in the film’s shrewd, illuminating exploration of a man whose influence, for better or worse, may have far outdone even his wildest dreams". David Klion of The New Republic wrote, "As a portrait of Cohn, the documentary is riveting". Justin Chang of the Los Angeles Times wrote, "The movie can’t fully disguise its glee as it lingers over the particulars of Cohn’s death — or, for that matter, its all-too-convincing lament that his spirit is still alive and well". Brian Lowry of CNN wrote, "Where's My Roy Cohn? is by no means a flattering portrait; rather, the film portrays Cohn as being emblematic of everything that's wrong with politics, class disparity and the current toxic political environment".

Katherine Steinbach of Nonfics wrote, "Matt Tyrnauer’s scintillating, gossipy, heavy-handed documentary Where’s My Roy Cohn? delves into Cohn’s contradictions without much illumination". Armond White of the National Review wrote, "Where’s My Roy Cohn? typifies the “Gotcha” doc, a genre of the Fake News era that ignores objectivity and fairness in order to press politicized righteousness". Charles Bramesco of The A.V. Club wrote, "Anyone with the vaguest consciousness of American political history doesn’t need 97 minutes to learn that this dead-eyed ethical vacuum was a bad person, or even the depth of his badness".

References

External links 

 

Films directed by Matt Tyrnauer
Sony Pictures Classics films
2010s English-language films